Rocha may refer to:

 Rocha  (surname), a Portuguese surname
 Rocha, Moca, Puerto Rico, a barrio in the municipality of Moca, Puerto Rico
 Rocha, Rio de Janeiro, a neighborhood in Rio de Janeiro, Brazil
 Rocha, Uruguay, capital city of the Rocha Department
 Rocha Department, a department in the east of Uruguay

See also 
 A Rocha, an international conservation organization with a Christian ethos
 Pêra Rocha, a Portuguese variety of pear
 Rocca (disambiguation)